ATK Praha may refer to:

 Dukla Prague, football team competing as ATK Praha between 1948 and 1952
 HC ATK Praha, ice hockey team known under the name of ATK Praha between 1948 and 1952